The Protestant Dissenters Act (15 & 16 Vict., c. 36) was an Act of the Parliament of the United Kingdom regarding places of worship for Protestant Dissenters. It replaced the requirement of the Toleration Act 1689 to register such places of worship with the Clerk of the Peace or a settlement's Anglican bishop or archdeacon with registration with the Registrar General. It also gave every Clerk of the Peace three months after the Act's passing to make a return of all such Places of Worship registered under the old system.

It consisted of three sections:
 Outline of the changes brought by the Act
 Set a 2s 6d fee for certification
 Required the Registrar General to create an annual list of the places of worship, which was to be accessible for free at the office of every Superintendent Registrar of Births, Marriages and Deaths in England

References

United Kingdom Acts of Parliament 1852
English Dissenters